William Stourton, 11th Baron Stourton (c. 1594 – 25 April 1672) was the son of Edward Stourton and Frances Tresham. He married Frances Moore (d. 5 January 1662), daughter of Sir Edward More. William and Frances had five children;

William
Mary (d. 1650); married Sir John Weld
Frances; was a nun
Edward (1617 – January 1644); married and had issue
Thomas (d. 1684, in Paris); was a monk

His eldest son William died young and childless, and he was succeeded by his grandson William, son of Edward.

William was a Cavalier and a Catholic, and suffered heavily due to this. Stourhead, his home, was at one point garrisoned for the King and then, in September 1644, was ravaged by General Ludlow.

References

 Kidd, Charles and Williamson, David (editors). Debrett's Peerage and Baronetage (1995 edition). London: St. Martin's Press, 1995, 

1672 deaths
11
Recusants
Year of birth uncertain
17th-century English nobility